Mirko Selak (born 30 January 1978) is a Croatian retired football forward.

Career
Selak was the top scorer in the Danish first division in 2002.

Selak competed in the UEFA Europa League for Ukrainian club FC Metalurh Zaporizhzhya in 2006.

Honours
Danish 1st Division Top Goalscorer: 2001–02

References

External links
 
Boldklubben Frem profile 

1978 births
Living people
Footballers from Split, Croatia
Association football forwards
Croatian footballers
Boldklubben af 1893 players
Boldklubben Frem players
FC Metalurh Zaporizhzhia players
NK Istra 1961 players
NK Mosor players
Anagennisi Karditsa F.C. players
HNK Zmaj Makarska players
Danish Superliga players
Danish 1st Division players
Ukrainian Premier League players
Croatian expatriate footballers
Expatriate men's footballers in Denmark
Croatian expatriate sportspeople in Denmark
Expatriate footballers in Ukraine
Croatian expatriate sportspeople in Ukraine
Expatriate footballers in Greece
Croatian expatriate sportspeople in Greece